Nicola van Westerhout (also Niccolò; 17 December 1857 – 21 August 1898) was an Italian composer.

Biography

History and formal training
Of Flemish origin, the family van Westerhout settled in Apulia in the seventeenth century, first in Bari and then in Monopoli. Nicola van Westerhout, grandfather of Niccolò, moved to Mola di Bari, where the composer himself and his father, Onofrio Augustine, were both born.

At the age of 13, van Westerhout composed an opera on the subject of Shakespeare's Julius Caesar, showing a remarkable musical talent. He was then helped, by the City Council of Mola di Bari, to move to Naples and attend the Conservatory of San Pietro a Majella, where he studied composition with Nicola De Giosa, Nicola D'Arienzo and Lauro Rossi. In Naples, he lived all his life.

Artistic activity
The catalog of Niccolò van Westerhout, in addition to a wide array of chamber music and symphonic works, includes five operas: Tilde, which has been lost; Cimbelino, which was first performed at the Teatro Argentina in Rome in 1892; Fortunio, represented in Milan in 1894 (intended, originally, at the Teatro alla Scala in Milan, but then staged at the Teatro Lirico), Doña Flor, at the Teatro Municipale in Mola di Bari in 1896, Colomba, represented in 1925 at the Teatro San Carlo.

Death and posthumous awards
Westerhout died in Naples. Because of indigence besetting the family, the City of Naples paid for funeral and burial in the monumental Cemetery of Poggioreale.

After the death of Niccolò, his friends and his brother Vincent tried to offer his music compositions to various publishers but they were unable to bear the costs necessary for its distribution and his music was soon forgotten.

Recently, the tomb that housed the remains of the composer and some of his relatives has been identified at the Congregation of St. Raphael a Mater Dei. On 19 February 2007, the 150th anniversary of the birth, the bones were then transported to the city that gave him birth and now rest in the family tomb of the De Stasi family's mausoleum in the local cemetery.

In Mola di Bari, the composer had been commemorated with the naming of a street and the municipal theater and the placing of a plaque at the site of the birthplace. Furthermore, in the central Piazza XX Settembre, a bronze statue by Molese sculptor Bruno Calvani, representing the protagonist of the Doña Flor, was placed.

Catalog
Sempre amore Romanza on a text by Mancini

Operas
Cimbelino, lyrical drama in four acts, libretto by Enrico Golisciani, (Rome, Teatro Argentina, 1892)
Fortunio, lyrical drama in three acts, libretto by Giulio Massimo Scalinger, (Milan, Teatro Lirico, 16 May 1895)
Doña Flor, lyrical drama in one act, libretto by Arturo Colautti, (Mola di Bari, 18 April 1896)
Colomba, libretto by Arturo Colautti, (Naples, Teatro San Carlo, 1925)
Tilde (unperformed)
A Night in Venice (unfinished), later integrated in Cimbelino
Imogene (unfinished), later integrated in Cimbelino

Bibliography
 Massimeo A., Niccolò Van Westerhout, Laterza, Bari, 1985.
 Summa, M., Destati, o bruna. Doña Flor di Niccolò van Westerhout, Lodo Editore, Latiano 1998.
 AA.VV. Un musicista crepuscolare: Niccolò Van Westerhout (1857-1898)(a cura di G.Ciliberti) Florestano, Bari, 2007. (The authors of this collection of essays are mostly students of the "Scuola di didattica della musica" of the Conservatorio "N.Rota" in Monopoli).
 Leonardo Campanile e Tiziano Thomas Dossena, Doña Flor, an opera by Niccolò van Westerhout, Idea Publications, New York, 2010, 
 Leonardo Campanile e Tiziano Thomas Dossena, Colomba, by Niccolò van Westerhout; Drama in Four Acts, Idea Press, Port St. Lucie, 2020, 
 Leonardo Campanile e Tiziano Thomas Dossena, Cimbelino, by Niccolò van Westerhout; Drama in Four Acts, Idea Press, Port St. Lucie, 2020, 
 Leonardo Campanile e Tiziano Thomas Dossena, Doña Flor, by Niccolò van Westerhout; Drama in One Act, Idea Press, Port St. Lucie, 2020, 
 Leonardo Campanile e Tiziano Thomas Dossena, Fortunio, by Niccolò van Westerhout; Drama in Three Acts, Idea Press, Port St. Lucie, 2020, 
 Niccolò van Westerhout, Liriche per Voce e Pianoforte, Idea Press, Port St. Lucie, 2018, 
 Niccolò van Westerhout, Liriche - Songs For Voice and Piano, Idea Press, Port St. Lucie, 2017, 
 Niccolò van Westerhout, Doña Flor, Vocal Score, Idea Press, Port St. Lucie, 2014,

References

External links 
  List of articles on van Westerhout appeared on the American quarterly L'Idea.
  Special issue on Dona Flor of the American quarterly L'Idea.
 

1857 births
1898 deaths
People from the Province of Bari
Italian classical composers
Italian male classical composers
Italian opera composers
Male opera composers
Italian people of Belgian descent
19th-century classical composers
19th-century Italian composers
19th-century Italian male musicians